Londonderry Township is the name of some places in the U.S. state of Pennsylvania:

Londonderry Township, Bedford County, Pennsylvania
Londonderry Township, Chester County, Pennsylvania
Londonderry Township, Dauphin County, Pennsylvania

See also 
 North Londonderry Township, Lebanon County, Pennsylvania
 South Londonderry Township, Lebanon County, Pennsylvania

Pennsylvania township disambiguation pages